Mac Arnold (born June 30, 1942), is an American blues musician from South Carolina.

Early years
Mac Arnold was born in Ware Place, South Carolina, one of 13 children born and raised on his father's farm.

Arnold's musical journey began in the 1950s when he and his brother Leroy fashioned a guitar from a steel gas can, broomsticks, wood, nails, and screen wire:

Arnold has since become famous for the gas-can guitar and has taught many other people how to make them.

His early career included working with a young James Brown in the band, J. Floyd & the Shamrocks. Arnold moved to Chicago in 1965, where he worked with A.C. Reed prior to joining Muddy Waters' band in 1966.  Arnold appears on the November 1966 live recording released in 2009 as Muddy Waters - Authorized Bootleg. He formed the Soul Invaders in 1967, finding work backing up B.B. King, The Temptations, Little Milton and many others.

Mac's studio work in the 1960s includes playing bass on several notable blues albums, including Otis Spann's The Blues Is Where It's At and John Lee Hooker's Live At Cafe Au Go Go.  He performed in various session work after moving to California in the 1970s.  Arnold's distinctive bass line can be heard on the theme for the TV show Sanford and Son.

His TV work also included a four-year gig as part of the set band on Soul Train.

Later years
By the 1990s, Arnold had grown weary of the road life and returned home to Pelzer, South Carolina and virtual retirement from the spotlight  until 2006, when he was convinced to front his own band, Plate Full O' Blues.  Arnold's return to the stage was the subject of a 2-part musical-history documentary, Stan Woodward's final film, Nothing to Prove: Mac Arnold's Return to the Blues.

In 2013, Arnold opened his own restaurant in Greenville, South Carolina's historic West End, where he hosted his popular yearly music event, The Cornbread and Collard Greens Blues Festival. Despite much local success in the food business, he decided to close the restaurant in August 2017 to once again concentrate on music, especially after his nomination into the Alabama Blues Hall of Fame.

On September 23, 2017, Mac Arnold was inducted into the Alabama Blues Hall of Fame at the historic Dr. John R. Drish House in Tuscaloosa, Alabama.

Awards and recognition
The Blues Foundation Awards
Nominee, Best Traditional Blues Male Artist 2012.
Nominee, Best DVD 2011, Woodward Studio, Nothing to Prove, Mac Arnold.
Winner, Best Historical Album of the Year 2010, Chess Records - Authorized Bootleg (Muddy Waters)  Mac Arnold appears on the album and accepted the award in Memphis.
Winner 2006 Folk Heritage Award 
Awarded honorary doctorate of music from the University of South Carolina, May 10, 2014 
Alabama Blues Hall of Fame, inductee, 2017 

Mac Arnold was included in the 2021 edition of the South Carolina African American History Calendar.

Music in schools
Arnold and the band support the preservation of music education in public schools through the, "I Can Do Anything Foundation", an organization that was started following the release of a song by the same name, written by Mac Arnold and Max Hightower and performed by Plate full O' Blues.

Discography

With Otis Spann
The Blues Is Where It's At (BluesWay, 1966)

References

External links
 Mac Arnold website
 VIDEO: Blues legend Mac Arnold scorches the blues on his gas can guitar
 Video of blues man Mac Arnold performing on Saturday afternoon at Bele Chere 2008 in Asheville, NC.
 Mac Arnold and Plate Full O' Blues - Cackalacky Twang (live in Concord, NC)
 Mac Arnold and Plate Full O' Blues - Train Smoke (Uptown Charlotte, NC @ The BBQ, Brews and Blues Festival - 10-18-2013)
 Bids & Blues fundraiser raises $35,000 for Thrive in Hendersonville Mac Arnold's blues benefit for mental health - Mountain Xpress (September 26, 2016)
 Playback: Mac Arnold Interview with Renee Denton - WNCW FM (March 5, 2018)
 PHOTOS: Mac Arnold and Plate Full O’Blues - Spartanburg Herald-Journal (September 5, 2018)

1942 births
Living people
American blues guitarists
American male bass guitarists
Guitarists from South Carolina
Blues bass guitarists
20th-century American bass guitarists
African-American guitarists
People from Pelzer, South Carolina
People from South Carolina
20th-century American male musicians
20th-century African-American musicians
21st-century African-American people